Ahmedabad Junction railway station (station code: ADI) is the main railway station of Ahmedabad, Gujarat, India. It is also the biggest railway station within Gujarat and also one of the major railway station in India. It is the highest income-generating division in Western Railways. It connects to Mumbai, Chennai,  and other major cities of India. Also it is central railway station of Gujarat which connects to Saurashtra, Kutch, Himmatnagar, Bhavnagar, etc.

History
Before the partition of India, the Sindh Mail used to travel to Hyderabad, Sindh via the Hyderabad–Mirpur Khas–Khokhrapar–Munabao–Barmer–Luni–Jodhpur–Pali–Marwar–Palanpur–Ahmedabad route. It was constructed by Gokuldas Contractor and Associates.

On the north side of the station are the two tallest minarets in Ahmedabad, the only remnant of Sidi Bashir Mosque.

Background
Ahmedabad Junction is the primary station of rail transport for the city of Ahmedabad in the state of Gujarat, India and an important center of the Western Railways zone of the Indian Railways. Locally, people refer to it as Kalupur Station (as it is situated in the Kalupur area of the walled city) to distinguish it from other stations in the city.
It contains total 12 platforms and 16 tracks. It serves trains that connect Ahmedabad to different parts of Gujarat, as well as major Indian cities.

Railway lines
It is the center point railway station of Gujarat many lines begin from here. It includes Ahmedabad–Mumbai main line, Ahmedabad–Delhi main line (via Jaipur), Ahmedabad–Howrah main line, Ahmedabad–Chennai main line, Ahmedabad–Surendranagar line (via Viramgam), Ahmedabad–Gandhidham main line, Jaipur–Ahmedabad line, Ahmedabad–Udaipur line, Ahmedabad–Botad Section.

List of Suburban stations of Ahmedabad

There are total 19 railway station present in Ahmedabad:

Major railway stations are:
Sabarmati Junction SBT
Sabarmati Junction SBIB

Chandlodiya B

Minor railway stations are:

Chandkhera Road
Vastrapur
Ambli Road

Gora ghuma
Kali Road

Sarkhej

Loco Sheds
Vatva's Diesel Loco Shed holds over 100 ALCO locomotives,
including the WDG-3A, WDM-3A, WDM-3D, WDS-6, WAP-4 and WAG-5 while Sabarmati's Diesel Loco Shed holds over 200 EMD locomotives, including the WDP 4D, WDG 4, WDG 4D, and WDG-5.

Infrastructure
The station has 12 platforms. There are an ample numbers of tea stalls, snack bars, medical shops, and enquiry desks. The station also has one cybercafe which is run by Tata Indicom and is currently equipped with Wi-Fi by Google Station and RailTel. The station is undergoing large-scale automation to make it a technologically advanced station, and new ATM outlets from ICICI Bank, Canara Bank, Union Bank of India, Dena Bank, Bank of Baroda, State Bank of India, and other major banks have been installed. RailTel plans to open a cyber cafe in Ahmedabad Station.

Facilities
Ahmedabad Railway station has launched hand-push luggage trolley services at Ahmedabad railway station. Such trolleys are always available at airports, but for railway stations, it is a new initiative. The Railways will initially charge Rs 5 per luggage trolley from commuters. As of 2010, the service was available only for Platform no.1, but after new elevators and escalators become functional by the end of 2010, the trolley service would be introduced at all platforms of Ahmedabad railway station.

Recent days, IRCTC has launched its VIP class executive lounge on platform 1 for passengers to spend their waiting time on economy rates which offers free wifi, urinals, AC, news paper, recliners and foods.

References

External links

Railway stations in Ahmedabad
Ahmedabad railway division
Railway junction stations in Gujarat
Year of establishment missing